Glastonbury Center is a census-designated place (CDP) that constitutes the densely populated center of the town of Glastonbury in Hartford County, Connecticut, United States. The population was 7,387 at the 2010 census, out of a total town population of 34,427.

Geography
The Route 17 and Route 2 expressways merge at the northeast edge of the CDP, bypassing the center of the village.

Demographics
As of the census of 2000, there were 7,157 people, 3,257 households, and 1,866 families residing in the CDP. The population density was 1,500.0 inhabitants per square mile (579.3/km2). The racial makeup of the CDP was 95.49% White, 0.88% African American, 0.21% Native American, 1.80% Asian, 0.94% from other races, and 0.68% from two or more races. Hispanic or Latino of any race were 2.57% of the population.

There were 3,257 households, out of which 24.2% had children under the age of 18 living with them, 47.6% were married couples living together, 7.8% had a female householder with no husband present, and 42.7% were non-families. 36.8% of all households were made up of individuals, and 17.2% had someone living alone who was 65 years of age or older. The average household size was 2.14 and the average family size was 2.84.

In the CDP, the population was spread out, with 20.2% under the age of 18, 4.0% from 18 to 24, 28.7% from 25 to 44, 25.3% from 45 to 64, and 21.8% who were 65 years of age or older. The median age was 43 years. For every 100 females, there were 81.9 males. For every 100 females age 18 and over, there were 77.2 males.

The median income for a household in the CDP was $58,947, and the median income for a family was $88,881. Males had a median income of $61,780 versus $43,646 for females. The per capita income for the CDP was $35,293. About 0.7% of families and 2.2% of the population were below the poverty line, including none of those under age 18 and 7.2% of those age 65 or over.

References

Glastonbury, Connecticut
Census-designated places in Hartford County, Connecticut
Census-designated places in Connecticut